Blinkberg Pass (English: Glittering Mountain) is situated in the Western Cape province of South Africa on the road between Prince Alfred's Hamlet and Wuppertal.

Mountain passes of the Western Cape